The Tano or Tanoé River is a river in Ghana. It flows for 400 kilometres from a town called Traa a suburb of Techiman the capital town of Bono East Region of the Republic of Ghana to Ehy Lagoon, Tendo Lagoon and finally Aby Lagoon in Ivory Coast where it enters the Atlantic Ocean. The river forms the last few kilometres of the international land boundary between Ghana and Ivory Coast.

Indigious local beliefs of Bono hold that Taakora, the highest of the Bono gods on Earth lives at the source of the river.

The last few individuals of Miss Waldron's Red Colobus (Piliocolobus badius waldronae), one of the world's most threatened primates, are believed to live in the forest between the river and Ehy Lagoon. As of mid-2008, this area is slated for logging by Unilever, with the aim to replace it with oil palm plantations.

In January of 2020, a truck with loads of sulphuric acid plunged into the Tano river. On January 13 the people were advised to not drink the water because of contamination. The river has since been restored to its natural state.

See also
Tano River
Drying up of the Tano River
Human Activities Dries up Tano River
Tanoso Residents do not eat fish in the Tano River

Footnotes

References
  (2005): Update on the Search for Miss Waldron's Red Colobus Monkey. International Journal of Primatology 26(3): 605–619.  (HTML abstract)
  (2008): Tanoé Swamps Forest destruction by Unilever. Version of 2008-MAY-28. Retrieved 2008-JUN-24.

Rivers of Ivory Coast
Rivers of Ghana
International rivers of Africa
Ghana–Ivory Coast border
Border rivers